Frankie Lagana (born 22 February 1985 in Shepparton, Australia) is a professional association football player who currently plays for Goulburn Valley Suns FC. He is a central midfielder although he can play out left. His Airdrie United debut came in the 3-2 friendly defeat to Norwich City at New Broomfield, Airdrie. Before making the move to Scotland Lagana had been playing for the Melbourne Knights in the Victorian Premier League.

In 2014, he returned to his hometown for Goulburn Valley Suns' inaugural year in the National Premier Leagues Victoria.

References

External links

1985 births
Melbourne Knights FC players
Australian Institute of Sport soccer players
Living people
Soccer players from Melbourne
Australian people of Italian descent
Australian expatriate soccer players
Airdrieonians F.C. players
Scottish Football League players
Expatriate footballers in Scotland
Association football midfielders
Oakleigh Cannons FC players
People of Calabrian descent
Goulburn Valley Suns FC players
Australian soccer players